Homeobox protein Hox-C8 is a protein that in humans is encoded by the HOXC8 gene.

Function 

This gene belongs to the homeobox family of genes. The homeobox genes encode a highly conserved family of transcription factors that play an important role in morphogenesis in all multicellular organisms. Mammals possess four similar homeobox gene clusters, HOXA, HOXB, HOXC and HOXD, which are located on different chromosomes and consist of 9 to 11 genes arranged in tandem. This gene is one of several homeobox HOXC genes located in a cluster on chromosome 12. The product of this gene may play a role in the regulation of cartilage differentiation. It could also be involved in chondrodysplasias or other cartilage disorders. HOXC8 was found to have activity in promoting nerve growth and its expression is dysregulated in patients with neurofibromatosis type 1.

See also 
 Homeobox

Interactions 

HOXC8 has been shown to interact with Mothers against decapentaplegic homolog 6 and Mothers against decapentaplegic homolog 1.

References

Further reading

External links 
 

Transcription factors